Marné Coetzee (born 17 September 1993) is a South African rugby union player for the  in the Currie Cup and in the Rugby Challenge. His regular position is tighthead prop.

Career

Youth / Blue Bulls / South Africa Schools

After the latter tournament, he was also selected in a South Africa Schools team. He started for them in their 21–14 victory over France in Port Elizabeth.

Sharks / South Africa Under-20

After finishing high school, Coetzee moved to Durban to join the  academy. He made eight appearances for the  squad during the 2012 Under-19 Provincial Championship, making eight appearances for his side as they reached the semi-final of the competition, before losing 35–46 to the s.

In 2013, Coetzee was selected in the South Africa Under-20 team that attempted to retain the IRB Junior World Championship title that they won in 2012. He played off the bench in their opening match of the competition as they beat the United States 97–0 and in their next match against England in their 31–24 victory. He started their final pool match against hosts France, helping his side to a 26–19 victory which ensured South Africa finished top of their pool and qualified to the semi-finals. He was an unused replacement as South Africa lost their semi-final match 17–18 to Wales, but once again played off the bench as South Africa clinched third spot in the competition by beating New Zealand 41–34, to win their fourth third-place play-off match in six years.

Coetzee returned to domestic action for the  side in the 2013 Under-21 Provincial Championship, making six appearances off the bench throughout the season. Coetzee's season ended in similar fashion as at Under-19 level the previous year, with his side reaching the semi-finals of the competition before losing to his former side, the Blue Bulls.

In 2015, Coetzee started the season by representing university side  in the 2015 Varsity Shield. He made two appearances for the side that went on to win the competition for the first time. He missed out on the final stages of that competition as he linked up with the  squad for the 2015 Vodacom Cup. He started their next match, a 12–32 defeat to  a week later and remained in the starting line-up for the remainder of the competition, making a total of seven appearances as the Sharks XV finished sixth on the Southern Section log to miss out on the quarter finals.

Pumas

References

South African rugby union players
Living people
1993 births
Rugby union players from Pretoria
Rugby union props
Sharks (Currie Cup) players
Pumas (Currie Cup) players
South Africa Under-20 international rugby union players
SWD Eagles players
Cheetahs (rugby union) players
Free State Cheetahs players